Susie Au Suet-yee, is a film-maker and versatile based in Hong Kong. Her works include T.V. commercials, music videos, feature films, documentaries and multi-installations.

She is noted for her stunning visual styles. She innovates electrifying exotic imagery that has stormed the music video field and the karaoke pubs in the region. Her work in music videos has earned her comparisons with Western contemporaries; "Au is Hong Kong's answer to the likes of American director Spike Jonze (Adaptation.) and Michel Gondry (Eternal Sunshine of the Spotless Mind) from France."

Susie lives in Hong Kong, Beijing, Berlin, San Francisco. Besides making advertising films, music videos, she is writing films; feature and short. Still striving to work outside of the box; as creative director, photographer, installation artist and theatre director.

She states,

Early life and education
Susie Au studied film-making at the State University of New York. She had directed short films in different genres during her stay in New York such as Among Fragments, Moon Chase, The Dream In New Orleans etc. She returned to Hong Kong with her awarded short film, To Hide and Seek.

Career

Music videos
She has directed over one hundred music videos and has been a long-time collaborator with popular musician Faye Wong (王菲) and alternative pop singer Anthony Wong (黃耀明). Other artists who have collaborated with Susie on more than one occasion include best album selling pop singers; Jacky Cheung (張學友), Eason Chan (陳奕迅), Andy Lau (劉德華), Joey Yung (容祖兒), Jeff Chang (張信哲), Miriam Yeung (楊千嬅), Grasshopper (草蜢), Mavis Fan (范曉萱), F4, Ellen Loo (盧凱彤), Tam Wai Wai (譚維維), Shirley Kwan (關淑怡), Ivana Wong (王苑之), Kary Ng (吳雨霏) and more.

Her works with Anthony Wong and Faye Wong won her gold awards from the Chicago International Film Festival. Faye Wong's Half Way (半途而廢) won the Best MTV Video Music Award. Mavis Fan's Why, Jeff Chang's True Love (用情) and Jacky Cheung's Web of Love (情網) were nominated for the Best Music Video of the year.

Susie is now taken as the region's M.V. guru, her visual style is noted for uniquely feminine, romantic yet innovative and electrifying. Also, most of the videos have become the region's karaoke classic; mass culture.

Films
Susie founded Handmade Films to diversify her visual adventure in different forms. She started directing T.V. commercials; mostly about contemporary women's life-style and fashion-oriented. Not only is Susie a rare female director in the region, she is also the first Chinese director to direct Christian Dior's first-launched T.V.C. in the China market.

Susie states her ambition is to create and recreate, enjoys filming on the set and never gets bored in the editing suite. Among all other projects, she inspired the music industry to create various music projects; Susie is a pioneer in music documentaries, collaborating with musicians to create innovative visuals for concerts and experimental films.

In 2005, Susie made a forty-five-minute musical film Moon Wall (牆前明月光); produced by now.com.hk, starring Karena Lam (林嘉欣) and Rebecca Pan (潘迪華). Written by GC Goo-Bi, music by Peter Kam (金培達). The film premiered at United Artist Cinema at Langham.

In 2007, Susie made her first feature debut Ming Ming,  starring Zhou Xun (周迅), Daniel Wu (吳彥祖) and Tony Yang (楊祐寧). 
The film selected to be screened in Pusan, Hong Kong, Taiwan and Shanghai International Film Festival, the film gets reviewed as "Run Lola Run meets new generation's wuxia… "; "Ming Ming's world, one which contains fantasy martial arts elements, the magical realism which set in today's contemporary era." Ming Ming was released in China, Hong Kong and Taipei simultaneously. The film marked an unusual independent film effort to create a China-Hong Kong-Taiwan alliance before the huge film market developed.

In 2008, Susie directed a 45-minute short titled Moving On, in which the scene of Eason Chan casually humming along the abandoned back in fact expanding on the director's continual themes on nostalgic and alienated emotion to Hong Kong.

In 2010, collaborating with pop legend Faye Wong, Susie created a music documentary titled Faye Reborn.

In 2011, Susie was invited by mainstream director Jeff Lau (劉鎮偉) to be the Music Director for East Meets West 2011 (東成西說 2011). Not only Susie directed a few musical scenes, she has revived the classic songs for film and created an emotional sound track.

In 2012, Susie directed and scripted Beauty University (美麗大學); starring Shu Qi (舒淇). It is the story written about contemporary Chinese women. It is rarely found in China viro on short drama driven by visuals than dialogue. The film is a visual meditation on the values of modern living and marriage. It is well received in China during the launch.

In 2013, Susie is invited by Juno Mak (麥俊龍) to direct the music video of "Poison Love" with Zombie Boy (Rick Genest).

In 2014, Susie focused on developing her feature film scripts and installation art projects.

In 2015, her new film project Crazy Girls Dancing Club (working title) was selected by Medienboard Berlin-Brandenburg and invited as a resident artist in Berlin.

In 2016, Susie was invited to Berlin by Nipkow Programme as artist in residence to create TV series. In this year, Susie also created and directed a multimedia-dance-theatre Utopia, Momentarily. Partnering with lyricist Chow Yiu Fai (周耀輝) and musician Vicky Fung Wing Ki (馮穎琪), the project was sponsored by Hong Kong New Vision Arts Festival, after one and half year's endeavour,  Utopia, Momentarily launched in Kwai Ching Theatre in November 2016. Not only pop singers like Anthony Wong (黃耀明), Juno Mak (麥俊龍), Eman Lam (林二汶) and Yoyo Sham (岑寧兒) were invited to perform the songs, the project involved many first endeavours for the festival. Not only Susie is the theatre director, she also created and designed all the visuals for the project. Utopia, Momentarily was highly acclaimed from both the pop and theatre field.

Filmography

Film

Installation art/theatre work

Awards and nominations

Music videos

TV commercials

References

External links
 
 ]
 Facebook page

Female music video directors
Hong Kong film directors
Living people
Place of birth missing (living people)
Year of birth missing (living people)
Hong Kong women artists